Myalyeshkavichy is a village in Gomel Region in Belarus.

By the Russian Empire Census of 1897 population of Myalyeshkavichy was 1329 people of whom 127 were Jews.

Populated places in Gomel Region
Villages in Belarus
Shtetls
Mazyr District